Shiryaev or Shiryayev is a Russian male surname, its feminine counterpart is Shiryaeva. It may refer to

Albert Shiryaev (born 1934), Russian mathematician
Boris Shiryaev (1889–1959), was a Russian writer 
 Maksim Shiryayev (footballer, born 1975), Russian football player
 Maksim Shiryayev (footballer, born 1995), Russian football player
Sergey Shiryayev (born 1983), Russian cross country skier 
Vyacheslav Shiryayev (born 1973), Russian football player
Yevhen Shyryayev (born 1984), Ukrainian football goalkeeper
 Alexandra Shiryayeva (born 1983), Russian beach volleyball player
Yuliya Shiryayeva (born 1994), Kazakhstani footballer